1 Area Support Group was a Canadian Army formation that provided support to other Canadian Army formations and units in western Canada.

Former Constituent bases and units
1 Area Support Group consists of 12 bases and units:

Canadian Forces Base Shilo, near Brandon, Man.
Canadian Forces Base Suffield, located near Medicine Hat, Alberta.
Canadian Forces Base Edmonton
Area Support Unit Calgary
Area Support Unit Chilliwack
1 Area Support Group Headquarters, based at CFB Edmonton
1 Service Battalion, based at CFB Edmonton
1 Military Police Unit, headquartered at CFB Edmonton
731 Signals Squadron, based at CFB Shilo
742 Signals Squadron, based at CFB Edmonton
The Royal Canadian Artillery Band, based at CFB Edmonton

Restructuring
With the re-organization and re-structuring of the Canadian Army the 1st Area Support Group was merged with Area Support Unit Edmonton to organize the 3rd Canadian Division Support Group.

References

External links
1 Area Support Group website

Military units and formations of the Canadian Army